The Church of St Cuby, Cuby, is in the village of Cuby, Cornwall, England. Since 1967 the church has been designated a Grade I listed building. It is an active Anglican parish church in the diocese of Truro, the archdeaconry of Cornwall and the deanery of Pydar. Its benefice is combined with that of Cornelly.

History
The church was dedicated to St. Cuby, a Welsh saint, around the 6th century CE. When the Church of St James at Tregony was submerged by the River Fal and subsequently abandoned in around 1540, the Church of St. Cuby became the parish church for Tregony. The current structure is a mixture of 12th-century, 14th-century and 15th-century architecture: some of the north side of the church and the tower is 14th century while the nave and south wall have some surviving 15th-century features. The church underwent major reconstruction in the 17th century, being lengthened and rebuilt in 1828 and then extensively restored in 1899. Some of the medieval masonry still exists on the north side and the tower (of two stages) is of the 14th century. In the south aisle is an inscribed stone of the 6th or 7th century (Nonnita Ercilini Rigati [...]tris Fili Ercilini). The church in Norman times belonged to the alien priory at Tregony but in 1278 ownership passed to Merton Priory in Surrey.

External features
In the churchyard are two Grade II listed buildings: one is a mid 19th century chest tomb by Julef of Ladock that is 7 metres south of the east end of the church and the other a 19th-century granite coffin on a plinth which is situated 2 metres north of the east end of the church.

Notable burial
William Hennah, first lieutenant of HMS Mars is buried at Cuby Parish Church. His ship was part of the British fleet under Lord Nelson at the Battle of Trafalgar.

References

Grade I listed churches in Cornwall
Church of England church buildings in Cornwall